The Russian Second League 1997 was the sixth edition of the Second Division. There were 3 zones with 61 teams starting the competition (3 were excluded before the end of the season). This was the last season that the professional Russian Third League existed. Next season the Second League became the lowest professional level once again.

Zone West

Overview

Standings

Top goalscorers 

33 goals

 Aleksandr Kuzmichyov (FC Arsenal Tula)

32 goals

 Dmitri Kirichenko (FC Torpedo Taganrog)

26 goals

 Vladimir Kharin (FC Lokomotiv Liski)

21 goals

 Andrei Bakalets (FC MChS-Selyatino Selyatino)

16 goals

 Oleg Delov (FC Avangard Kursk)

14 goals

  Anderson (FC Arsenal Tula)
 Anatoli Balaluyev (FC Avtomobilist Noginsk)
 Alik Dulayev (FC Avtodor Vladikavkaz)
 Grigori Ivanov (FC Avtodor Vladikavkaz)
 Mikhail Shumilin (FC MChS-Selyatino Selyatino)

Zone Center

Overview

Standings

Top goalscorers 

26 goals

 Eduard Zatsepin (FC Svetotekhnika Saransk)

25 goals

 Andrei Knyazev (FC Rubin Kazan)

22 goals

 Vladimir Filimonov (FC Energiya Chaikovsky)

19 goals

  Yuriy Yakovenko (FC Torpedo Arzamas)

17 goals

 Sergei Budarin (FC Nosta Novotroitsk)

16 goals

 Vladimir Pantyushenko (FC Rubin Kazan)

14 goals

 Vitali Papadopulo (FC Torpedo Arzamas)
 Konstantin Paramonov (FC Amkar Perm)

13 goals

 Aleksandr Katasonov (FC Amkar Perm)
 Andrei Minvaliyev (FC Tekstilshchik Ivanovo)

Zone East

Overview

Standings

Top goalscorers 

21 goals

 Aleksandr Yarkin (FC Viktoriya Nazarovo)

16 goals

 Vadim Belokhonov (FC Metallurg Krasnoyarsk)

15 goals

 Stanislav Chaplygin (FC Metallurg-Zapsib Novokuznetsk)
 Andrei Korovin (FC Amur-Energiya Blagoveshchensk)

14 goals

 Yevgeni Savin (FC Dynamo Barnaul)

13 goals

 Aleksei Kandalintsev (FC SKA Khabarovsk)
 Dmitri Kudinov (FC Tom Tomsk)

12 goals

 Sergei Ageyev (FC Tom Tomsk)
 Vyacheslav Vishnevskiy (FC Tom Tomsk)

11 goals

 Vyacheslav Fomin (FC Irtysh Tobolsk)
 Anatoli Kisurin (FC Dynamo Omsk)
 Anatoli Panchenko (FC Dynamo Barnaul)
 Sergei Rogalevskiy (FC Kuzbass Kemerovo)
 Yevgeni Sadovnikov (FC Zvezda Irkutsk)
 Igor Zykov (FC Selenga Ulan-Ude)

See also
1997 Russian Top League
1997 Russian First League
1997 Russian Third League

3
1997
Russia
Russia